The 1974 Havering Council election took place on 2 May 1974 to elect members of Havering London Borough Council in London, England. The whole council was up for election and the council went in no overall control.

Background

Election result

Ward results

Source:

References

1974
1974 London Borough council elections